USS Vincent (SP-3246) was a United States Navy patrol vessel in commission from 1917 or 1918 to 1919.

Vincent was built as a civilian wooden single-screw cabin motorboat of the same name in 1909 by Britt Brothers at Lynn, Massachusetts. The U.S. Navy acquired her under a free lease from her owner, the Transfer Company of Norwich, Connecticut, for use as a section patrol boat during World War I; sources differ on the date of the acquisition, suggesting that it could have happened in both June 1917 and June 1918. She was commissioned as USS Vincent (SP-3246); sources disagree on her commissioning date, stating that it was 28 June 1917, 20 June 1918, and 28 June 1918

Vincent was assigned to the 3rd Naval District. No deck logs have been found describing her service there, but she presumably performed patrol duties at least through the end of World War I.

The Navy returned Vincent to the Transfer Company on 28 June 1919 and she was stricken from the Navy List the same day.

Notes

References

Department of the Navy Naval History and Heritage Command Online Library of Selected Images: Civilian Ships: Vincent (American Motor Boat, 1908). Served in the Navy in 1918-1919 as Vincent (SP-3246)
NavSource Online: Section Patrol Craft Photo Archive Vincent (SP 3246)

Patrol vessels of the United States Navy
World War I patrol vessels of the United States
Ships built in Lynn, Massachusetts
1909 ships